Yavneh College is a co-educational, Jewish, secondary and sixth form school. A comprehensive with five-form entry for ages 11–18 yrs, it is part of the Yavneh College Academy Trust.

History
When founded, the school was led by headteacher Dr. Dena Coleman, who died in June 2013 just a few weeks before her planned retirement.

In September 2013, Mr Spencer Lewis took over the role of headteacher, having previously had the same role at King Solomon High School in Barkingside. The school previously had achieved specialist school status as a Business and Enterprise College (before converting to an academy).

References

External links
 http://www.yavnehcollege.org/
http://www.yavnehprimary.org/

Educational institutions established in 2006
Academies in Hertfordshire
Schools in Hertsmere
Jewish schools in England
Secondary schools in Hertfordshire
2006 establishments in England
Borehamwood